The Institutional Analysis and Development framework (IAD) was developed by Elinor Ostrom, an American political scientist, who was the first woman to receive the Nobel Memorial Prize in Economic Sciences in 2009. The IAD relates a set of concepts to help in the analysis of commons, such as fishery stocks, woodlands. Ostrom explored which institutional structures support arrangements that handle those resource stocks in a sustainable way, balancing individuals' use with the interest of a wider public.  Under the rational choice models, the IAD was devised in an attempt to explain and predict outcomes by formally exploring and documenting the governance structures, the actors' positions, and the informal and formal rules devised for individuals to extract resources from the commons resource. Thus, the IAD is a systematic method to document policy analysis functions similar to analytic technique commonly used in physical and social sciences and understand how institutions operate and change over a period of time.

Components of the framework 

Ostrom thought of the IAD as a "multi-level conceptual map" with which one could zoom in and out of particular hierarchical parts of the governance structures in a social system. 

The IAD framework helps to perceive complex collective action problems by dividing them into 'action arenas', that are smaller pieces of practically understandable function. The analyst assumes that the structure of the action situation is fixed in the short-term. For an action situation to exist, there must be "actors in positions" (the number of possible roles that are available in this recurring interaction situation). Actors have choices within the existing (rule) structure. In the study of outcomes from collective choice situations, actors are influenced by the institutional arrangements, the socio-economic conditions, and the physical environment. The institutional arrangements can be studied by seven rule types (as per below).

References

Further reading
 
 

Social institutions
Urban planning
Political science
Social systems